The Moscow School of Social and Economic Sciences (Shaninka) (Russian: Московская высшая школа социальных и экономических наук) is a non-state university founded in 1995 by Teodor Shanin, a renowned sociologist, peasant studies researcher, historian, and professor at the University of Manchester. Since 2011, the Rector of MSSES is Sergey Zuev.

MSSES comprises 8 departments that implement 35 educational programs for bachelor's degree, master's degree, and professional retraining. Around 1000 people study in MSSES every year. The average admission score for undergraduate programs is 80.6 points. MSSES ranks 6th among public and private universities in the quality of admission process for fee-based programs.

History
The origins of MSSES trace back to the period between 1989 and 1991, when Theodor Shanin, at the time a sociology professor at the University of Manchester, invited the future advancers of Russian sociology to take part in the three-month sociological field schools in Manchester and Kent organised by him A few years later, he established the Interdisciplinary Academic Centre for Social Sciences ("InterCentre"), which comprised two departments (study social structure of Russian society and Peasant Studies and Agricultural Reforms). At that time, Shanin collaborated with such researchers as Tatyana Zaslavskaya, Yuri Levada, Vadim Radaev, Oleg Kharkhordin, Vadim Volkov, Gennady Batygin and others.

In the early 1990s, Shanin realised that social studies were poorly represented in Russia, as opposed to various engineering disciplines, so he decided to establish several universities in Moscow on the basis of international collaboration. His main goal was to transform the outmoded Soviet technology of education using Western practices to give the students opportunities for self-education and independent thinking. Shanin acquired the support of the British Council and the Soros Foundation to implement his best ideas. The Ministry of Education granted permission solely for the Russian-British university but failed to fulfil the initial agreement, so Shanin had to ask for assistance from Abel Aganbegyan, the Rector of the Academy of National Economy. Aganbegyan helped in creating a new university on the territory of the academy.

In 2002, Teodor Shanin received the Order of the British Empire for "service to education in Russia".

The modern-day logo of MSSES was presented in 2012 and included the name "Shaninka '' as its essential element. By that time, MSSES had only postgraduate programs. The first undergraduate program, Creative Project Management and Global Politics, were presented only in 2014, but many other programs were presented over the subsequent years.

In 2018, Rosobrnadzor revoked Shaninka's accreditation. It kept its educational licence, which meant that Shaninka was still authorised to provide educational services but could not grant state-recognized degrees. This episode formed a large community of the School supporters, which included many graduates, academics, and public figures. On March 3, 2020, the accreditation expert panel gave a favourable review of all MSSES programs, and Rozobrnadzor acknowledged trier compliance with the Federal State Educational Standards. It happened one month after Shaninka's founder, Teodor Shanin, died on February 4, 2020.

During this period, MSSES did not stop the educational process and international collaboration. In 2019, the new partnerships were presented: first one was with the University of Turin (Italy) to implement a double-degree PhD programme in Law, and the other one with the Coventry University that also took part in establishing several double-diploma programs.

In 2021, Shaninka became a co-founder of the New University League along with the European University at Saint Petersburg, New Economic School, and the Skolkovo Institute of Science and Technology.

Campus 
The campus of MSSES is located in the centre of Moscow, on 3-5 Gazetnyy lane. Until 2018, Shaninka was located in the Southwest of Moscow on Vernadskiy Avenue.

Library 

Even before Shaninka acquired its own building, the gem of the School was its library designed by the English architect Dudley Yeo and supplied by efforts of the Liverpool School of Academic Librarians that selected 20 000 books in English at Shanin's request. Shanin valued the library more than any other school facility, so the official opening of MSSES was postponed until September 9, 1995 when the Library was ready for students.

The first director of the Library was Ian Bain, who left Scotland at Shanin's request. After two years of diligent work, he formed a perfect running structure and left to establish a new library in Singapore. At the time Shaninka was established, the collection of books was unique and one of its kind in Russia. The library gained Internet access in 1996, and the School presented a special course called Library & Computer Skills.

The library moved to Gazetnyy lane on December 3, 2018. The architect of the renewed Library became Nicholas Champkins, while Alisa Mozharova designed the space. Due to its unique design in trademark Shaninka purple and yellow colours, the Library became a landmark, so it offers excursions for non-student visitors.

Along with the friendly space for study and various community activities, the Library provides an inclusive environment and supports recycling initiatives.

Faculties

Faculty of Law 

The Faculty of Law was established in 1995 and became one of the first three faculties of MSSES. The Faculty delivers the following degrees:

 Bachelor's Programme ‘European Private Law Tradition’ 
 Russian-British Master's Programme ‘Comparative and International Private Law’; 
 Russian-British Master's Programme ‘Legal Advice for Asset Management’; 
 British Master's and Russian Retraining Programme ‘Legal Studies’; 
 PhD Programme in collaboration with the University of Turin.

Besides main international partners of MSSES, the Faculty also collaborates with the University of Turin (joined PhD program) and the Maastricht University (student internship), and provides joint academic activities with the University of Rome Tor Vergata and the Center for International Legal Studies in Salzburg.

The current Dean of the Faculty is Dmitriy Dozhdev.

Faculty of Social and Cultural Project Management 
The Faculty of Social and Cultural Project Management was established in 1998 by the initiative of the present-day Rector of MSSES Sergey Zuev. At the time, the University of Manchester, like many other British universities, did not have a faculty of cultural management, so first programs of the Faculty were validated by the University of Aberdeen. When the Cultural Management discipline was launched in Manchester, the training program was further validated by the University of Manchester.

The Faculty delivers the following degrees:

 Bachelor's Programme ‘Creative Projects Management’;
 Russian-British Master's Programme ‘Project Management’;
 Russian Master's Programme ‘Music Projects Management’;
 British Master's and Retraining Programme ‘Cultural Management’.

Faculty of Practical Psychology 
The Faculty of Practical Psychology was established in 1995 as the Faculty of Social Management and Social work, the first one in Russia. In order to comply with the British educational standards, the group of the future teachers of the Faculty was sent to the London School of Economics to study the didactic methods applied in the UK. In the middle of the 2000s, educational programs were substantially revised which resulted in the Faculty reorganisation and it was renamed the Faculty of Practical Psychology.

The Faculty delivers the following degrees:

 Bachelor's Programme ‘Psychological Counselling and Coaching’;
 Russian-British Master's Programme ‘Psychological Counselling’;
 British Master's and Russian Retraining Programme ‘Practical Psychology’;
 Master's Programme ‘The Psychology and Economics of Decisions in Management’.

The current Dean of the Faculty is Evgeniy Morgunov.

Faculty of Political Science 
The Faculty of Political Science was established in 1996 and had existed for 10 years before being closed in 2006. In 2010, it was reopened to revive its key tradition to focus on academic political theory and its relevant methods rather than on "applied political science".

The Faculty delivers the following degrees:

 Bachelor's Programme ‘World Politics’;
 Russian-British Master's Programme ‘Political Science and International Relations’;
 British Master's and Russian Retraining Programme ‘Political Philosophy’;
 Master's Programme ‘Political Philosophy’.

Besides main international partners of MSSES, the Faculty also collaborates with the University of Amsterdam and the Institute of Slavic Studies at Dresden University of Technology.

Faculty of Social Studies 
The Faculty of Social Studies was established in 1995 among the first three faculties of MSSES. Since 2012, it has been holding autumn field schools for students. Those schools have become part of the faculty's education process.

The Faculty delivers the following degrees:

Sociology Programmes:

 Bachelor's Programme ‘Contemporary Social Theory’;
 Russian-British Master's Programme ‘Fundamental Sociology’;
 British Master's and Russian Retraining Programme ‘Fundamental Sociology’;
 Master's Programme ‘Fundamental Sociology’.

History Programmes:

 British Master's and Russian Retraining Programme ‘Public History’;
 Russian-British Master's Programme ‘History of Soviet Civilization’.

The current Dean of the Faculty is Viktor Vakhshtayn.

Faculty of Educational Management 
The Faculty's primary goal is to promote the modernisation of the Russian education system. That can be achieved by training specialists in key educational fields, particularly in the field of education policy. The Faculty's objective is to form a cohort of highly qualified analysts and experts capable of analysing and shaping educational policies in their regions and the country at large.

In 2019, the Faculty launched a Center for Educational Policy Studies, which joined an international network of similar centres in 19 countries across the globe.

Currently, the Faculty delivers two professional retraining programs and a UK Master's degree program: "Data-Driven Education Systems Management" and "Management of Preschool Education and Early Childhood Development".

The current head of the faculty is Elena Fedorenko.

Faculty of Liberal Arts and Sciences 
The Faculty of Liberal Arts and Sciences was established in 2021. It offers the Liberal Arts & Sciences learning model, which allows second-year students to choose one of five specialisations and form their own individual educational trajectory.

The Faculty offers the following educational programmes:

 Music and Musical Theatre;
 Cinema: Film Studies and Film Production;
 Public Policy and International Projects;
 Contemporary Media Text;
 Entrepreneurship in Education.

Notable people 

 Sergey Zuev - Russian economist, specialist in cultural management, candidate of art history (1984), professor, current Rector of MSSES. Zuev was detained in October 2021 on embezzlement charges under Marina Rakova Case, which his supporters say are politically motivated.
 Viktor Vakhstayn - Russian sociologist, specialist in social theory and microsociology, the Dean of the Faculty of Social Studies of MSSES. On April 22, 2022, Viktor Vakhshtayn was included into the list of foreign agents by the Russian Ministry of Justice.
 Greg Yudin - Russian political scientist and sociologist, a professor of the Faculty of Political Science.  Yudin is an expert in public opinion and polling in Russia.  
 Ekaterina Schulmann - Russian political scientist specialising in legislative processes, a former associate professor of MSSES. On April 16, 2022, she was included into the list of foreign agents by the Russian Ministry of Justice.
 Boris Kagarlitsky - a Russian Marxist theoretician and sociologist, teaches political science and international relations in MSSES. On May 6, 2022, he was included into the list of foreign agents by the Russian Ministry of Justice
 Yuri Slezkine - a Russian-born American historian and translator. He is a professor of Russian history, Sovietologist, and Director of the Institute of Slavic, East European, and Eurasian Studies at the University of California, Berkeley. The teacher of History of Soviet Civilization in MSSES.

Controversies

Over accreditation
On 20 June 2018, the Federal Service for Supervision in Education and Science (Rosobrnadzor) revoked the accreditation of the Moscow School of Social and Economic Sciences. The decision was criticised. The School noted that, "The withdrawal of accreditation does not mean revoking the license to conduct education", and vowed to continue its work. This sanction may have been unfair.

In March 2020, the accreditation of the university was restored.

References 

Universities in Moscow
Economics schools